The 1913 Isle of Man Tourist Trophy races were increased in length to a six lap (226 mile) Junior race and to seven laps (262.5 mile) for the Senior race. The highest number of entries to date, one hundred and forty seven, were received for these races.

The 350cc Junior TT was won by H.Mason 2¾ hp NUT-Jap motor-cycle and the 500cc Senior TT Race by Tim Wood with a chain-driven 3½ hp Scott machine.

While leading the Senior TT race,  Frank Bateman, riding a Rudge crashed fatally on the fourth lap below the Shephard's Hut near to Keppel Gate.

Continental entries for the Senior TT race included E. Vailati (3½ hp Rudge) from Italy, K. Gassert (3½ hp NSU)  from Germany and  a Russian entrant M Kremleff also riding a Rudge, but he retired after crashing.

Junior TT final standings
Wednesday 4 & Friday 6 June 1913 –  6 laps (225 miles) Isle of Man TT Mountain Course

Fastest Lap: H.Mason  – 45.42 mph (49’ 32.0) on lap 6.

Senior TT 500cc Race final standings
Wednesday 4 & Friday 6 June 1913 –  7 laps (262.50 miles) Isle of Man TT Mountain Course

Fastest Lap: H.O. Wood  – 52.12 mph (43’ 10.0) on lap 3.

References

External links
1913 Isle of Man TT results

 
Isle of Man
1913 in motorsport
1913